John Ramsden (29 September 1878 – 12 August 1973) was a New Zealand cricketer. He played ten first-class matches for Otago between 1909 and 1915.

See also
 List of Otago representative cricketers

References

External links
 

1878 births
1973 deaths
New Zealand cricketers
Otago cricketers
Cricketers from Melbourne
Australian emigrants to New Zealand